The Tomb of Sikandar Lodi is the tomb of the second ruler of the Lodi Dynasty, Sikandar Lodi (reign: 1489–1517 CE) situated in New Delhi, India. The tomb is situated in Lodhi Gardens in Delhi and was built in 1517–1518 CE by his son Ibrahim Lodi. The monument is situated 100 meters away from the Bara Gumbad and the area in which it is situated was formerly a village called Khairpur.

History
Sikandar Lodi (born Nizam Khan), was the Sultan of Delhi between 1489 and 1517 CE and was the son of Bahlul Lodi. After the death of his father in 1489, Sikandar Lodhi assumed the reign the same year and ruled until his death in 1517 CE. Upon Sikandar Lodi's death in 1517 CE, his son Ibrahim Lodi built the tomb. The Tomb of Sikandar Lodi was inspired in parts by the tomb of Muhammad Shah which is also situated in the Lodhi Gardens.

Construction and architecture

The Tomb of Sikandar Lodi was inspired in parts by the tomb of  Muhammad Shah. It has octagonal design and the architectural style is Indo-Islamic. The tomb is the first garden tomb in Indian subcontinent and is India's earliest surviving enclosed garden tomb.

The tomb is enclosed within a fortified complex (entered from a south facing gateway) with the main entrance having two umbrella shaped domes (pavilions) which was designed to preserve the symmetry and relative proportions of the body of the building. Both pavilions on the square platform in the front have remains of blue tiles. The tomb is situated in the middle of a large garden and tall boundary walls. Tomb chamber is surrounded by a wide veranda with carved pillars with each side pierced by three arches and the angles occupied by sloping buttresses.

Tomb walls have Mughal architectural designs and many foreign languages have been inscribed on the walls. The tomb is decorated with enameled tiles of various colors. Inside the complex, the western wall has been built to serve as a wall mosque also since the Quibla is indicated through arches and paved area in the front.

Location
The Tomb of Sikandar Lodi is located in and is a part of the Lodhi Gardens in Delhi, India. The village, where the monument stands was earlier called Khairpur. The garden is bounded by Amrita Shergill Marg in the West, North-West and North, Max MuellerMarg on the East and Lodhi Road on the South Side. Safdarjang Tomb is situated on South-West corner of the Lodhi Garden.

Gallery

See also
Tomb of Bahlul Lodi
Ibrahim Lodhi's Tomb
Bara Gumbad
List of Monuments of National Importance in Delhi
Lodhi Gardens
Shisha Gumbad

References 

Mausoleums in Delhi
Domes
Architecture in India
Architecture of the Lodi dynasty
Tombs in Delhi
Buildings and structures completed in 1518
Monuments of National Importance in Delhi